The 1914–15 Penn State Nittany Lions basketball team represented Penn State University during the 1914–15 college men's basketball season. The team finished with a final record of 10–3.

Schedule

|-

References

Penn State Nittany Lions basketball seasons
Penn State
Penn State Nittany Lions Basketball Team
Penn State Nit